Mākara Beach, previously spelled Makara Beach, is a suburb of Wellington, New Zealand consisting of a small seaside village and its surrounding countryside. The Wellington City Council regards it as a separate suburb to Mākara.

Features 
The suburb is accessed through Makara Road, which enters the suburb in the south and continues north alongside Makara Stream until it reaches the coast at Ohariu Bay. This is the main bay of the suburb; the suburb also includes Warehou Bay and Smiths Bay. Makara Stream's estuary is described by Wellington City Council as "an important native ecosystem and is gradually being restored by the Makaracarpas, a local environmental group." The Makara Foreshore Reserve was once an area of sand dunes. In 1942, these dunes were bulldozed based on fears that invading Japanese could hide in them. Rare plants are gradually re-establishing themselves in the area.

Mākara Beach is a seaside village, 20 minutes drive from the suburb of Karori. It has a parking area for beach visitors. The beach is suitable for fishing and diving, and is a designated off-lead dog exercise area.

There is a 7 km walkway, managed by the Department of Conservation, that starts from the village. It follows the beach and goes through farmland up to historic gun emplacements.

History 
Mākara Beach had a resident community of fishermen in the 19th and 20th century, using solid clinker-built dinghies. Fisherman Leopold Haupois, known as French Louis, had arrived from Normandy in France in 1875; in the 1930s Lady Bledisloe the wife of the Governor-General used to visit French Louis to practise her French conversation.

Throughout the mid 1980s, the village was used as the fictional town Kaihoro in Peter Jackson’s 1987 film Bad Taste.

Mākara Beach was hit by Cyclone Gita in 2018. Homes were flooded and property was destroyed. The following year, a plan was announced to protect the village from future weather events due to climate change. The plan's recommendations included raising the beach's crest level, constructing a sea wall, clearing gravel from the stream's mouth, and reinforcing its bank.

During the national COVID lockdown in April 2020, residents erected a barricade and signs to keep visitors from the rest of Wellington out. While one resident said, "All we're doing is what the police are doing...telling people to go home", a lawyer told media that the public could not block roads and this could be a criminal offence.

Flooding in 2021 damaged a road which leads to Mākara Beach. It was estimated that repairs would cost NZD 1.5 million. This route to the suburb was closed for several weeks.

Demographics
Mākara is part of the Mākara-Ohariu statistical area.

External links

References

Suburbs of Wellington City
Bays of the Wellington Region
Beaches of the Wellington Region